Istana Bukit Kayangan is the Sultan of Selangor's second official palace, located in Shah Alam, Selangor, Malaysia.

See also
 Istana Alam Shah
 Istana Darul Ehsan
 Istana Mestika

References

Royal residences in Malaysia
Istana Bukit Kayangan
Shah Alam
Official residences of Malaysian state leaders